Trewhella is a surname. Notable people with the surname include:

David Trewhella (born 1962), Australian rugby league footballer
Ian Trewhella, Australian Paralympic athlete
Jill Trewhella, Australian biophysicist
Robert Trewhella (1830–1909), English railway engineer